Tannis Slimmon is a Canadian folk music singer-songwriter based in Guelph, Ontario. She is most noted for her 2008 album Lucky Blue, which won the Canadian Folk Music Award for Contemporary Album of the Year at the 4th Canadian Folk Music Awards.

Originally from Oak Lake, Manitoba, Slimmon began her musical career as a member of various bands in the Southwestern Ontario region, most notably the folk trio The Bird Sisters with Sue Smith and Jude Vadala, while also working as a laboratory supervisor for the University of Guelph. She also appeared as a backing vocalist on recordings by Barenaked Ladies, Rheostatics, Grievous Angels and Willie P. Bennett.

She released her debut solo album, Oak Lake, in 2001.

Discography
Oak Lake (2001)
Lucky Blue (2008)
In and Out of Harmony (2013)

References

External links

20th-century Canadian women singers
21st-century Canadian women singers
Canadian women singer-songwriters
Canadian folk singer-songwriters
Canadian Folk Music Award winners
Musicians from Guelph
Musicians from Manitoba
People from Westman Region, Manitoba
Living people
Year of birth missing (living people)